Al-Matariyyah or Matariye, Mataria, is a village in South Lebanon near the Litani river.

Populated places in Sidon District